Endless is a visual album by American singer Frank Ocean. It was released on August 19, 2016, as an exclusive streaming-only video on Apple Music, and preceded the August 20 release of Ocean's second studio album Blonde. Endless was later remastered and had a limited reissue in physical audio and visual formats on April 10, 2018.

The album followed a period of controversy for Ocean, who was in a highly publicized battle with Def Jam Recordings, and it was the subject of widespread media discussion upon release. Endless was recorded in various studios across California, as well as in London, Miami, and Berlin, with production handled primarily by Ocean, Vegyn, Michael Uzowuru, and Troy Noka; Ocean previously collaborated with Noka on his debut mixtape, Nostalgia, Ultra (2011).

The film follows Ocean silently woodworking on a staircase while the audio plays. Music journalists have noted the album features a minimalist aesthetic with a loose musical structure and contains similar elements featured on Blonde, including  ambient pop, avant-soul, R&B, and trap. Thematically, Endless explores Ocean's status as a celebrity, love and heartbreak, and age. It also contains uncredited guest appearances from Sampha and Jazmine Sullivan. 

Endless received generally positive reception, with critics praising the musical content, namely its abstract structural compositions, although some were divided over the visual aspects, noting its length. Upon its re-release, it was positively reassessed, with praise directed toward its variety and since then became a cult favorite among Frank Ocean fans.

Background
On February 21, 2013, Ocean confirmed work began for his second studio album, including tentative collaborations with Tyler, the Creator, Pharrell Williams, and Danger Mouse. Ocean also revealed it would be another concept album, and he was drawing influence from the Beach Boys and the Beatles. Ocean expressed an interest in collaborating with Tame Impala and stated an intention to record in Bora Bora. He also stated a desire to collaborate with Archy Marshall, better known as King Krule; however, Marshall stated in an interview with Pitchfork that the collaboration was not successful, saying: "Frank was at my house, yeah... He came down and he wanted me to do something for his record, but I don’t think he liked it."

In April 2014, Ocean stated his second album was nearly finished, and in June, Billboard reported the singer was working with Happy Perez, Charlie Gambetta and Kevin Ristro (whom he worked with on Nostalgia, Ultra), alongside Hit-Boy, Rodney Jerkins, and Danger Mouse. On November 29, 2014, Ocean released a snippet to "Memrise", a song rumored as the lead single from his new album, on Tumblr. The snippet received generally positive reception, with critics praising Ocean's musical experimentation and continued exploration of melancholic themes. 

On April 6, 2015, Ocean announced the follow-up to Channel Orange would be released in July, as well as a publication, although no further details were released. The album was ultimately not released in July, with no explanation given for its delay. The publication was rumored to be called Boys Don't Cry, and was slated to feature "Memrise".

Release and promotion
On July 2, 2016, he hinted at a possible second album on his website. It featured an image of a library card labeled "Boys Don't Cry" with numerous stamps, implying various due dates between July 2015 and November 2016. Ocean's brother, Ryan Breaux, further suggested a release in July 2016, with an Instagram caption of the image reading "BOYS DON'T CRY #JULY2016". On August 1, 2016, a live video hosted by Apple Music showing an empty hall was launched on the website boysdontcry.co. The website also featured a new "boysdontcry" graphic. The video marked the first update on the website since a "date due" post from July.

On August 1, 2016, a video appeared that showed Frank Ocean woodworking and sporadically playing instrumentals on loop. That same day, many news outlets reported that August 5, 2016, could be the release date for Boys Don't Cry. The video was revealed to be promotion for Endless, a 45-minute-long visual album that began streaming on Apple Music on August 19, 2016. It was later confirmed that Endless is a different project than Ocean's second studio album. The assumed title Boys Don't Cry had been replaced with a new title. Endless was his final album with Def Jam Recordings, which fulfilled his recording contract.

On April 24, 2017, Ocean aired a remix of "Slide on Me" featuring Young Thug on his radio show Blonded Radio. On November 27, on Cyber Monday, Ocean released physical, remastered editions of Endless, along with new merchandise.

Critical reception

Endless received generally positive reviews from critics. At Metacritic, which assigns a normalized rating out of 100 to reviews from mainstream publications, the album received an average score of 74, based on 13 reviews.

In The Guardian, Tim Jonze said Ocean mixed the pop with the avant-garde on Endless, calling it "a rich, varied and – at times – challenging musical feast", however noting that "much of this album floats by hazily and with no clear direction". In a joint review of Endless and Blonde for Q magazine, Victoria Segal said "these records might not eclipse Channel Orange, but they have their own mercurial gleam, mapping the spaces between people, reaching for a hazy intimacy that almost feels real." Ryan Dombal of Pitchfork wrote that "as a piece of filmed entertainment, Endless is painfully dull", however praised the "much more exciting" music, comparing it to a mixtape, and stating that it is "an intriguing peek into [Ocean's] process, and it contains some of the rawest vocal takes he's ever put out". For Consequence of Sound, Nina Corcoran wrote that the video "wobbles between its highs and lows". She was ambivalent to the music's abstract nature, noting that "is filled with beauty, but it feels like a dream where you don’t remember much, even if you take a pen to paper as soon as you wake". In a mixed review for AllMusic, Andy Kellman wrote that the tracks "melt into one another", concluding that "it's a smartly ordered patchwork of mostly secondary material".

Spin magazine's Brian Josephs was more critical, believing it did not work as an album. "As a whole, Endless feels formless," Josephs wrote, "like pretty, curlicue-flaunting cursive with no adherence to notebook margins." Dan Caffrey of The A.V. Club stated that the album's concept "would be slightly fascinating", if the length didn't result in "the video becom[ing] a chore to sit through". He praised the album's opening tracks, however criticised the music overall as "undercooked ambience, half-finished verses, and robotic descriptions of Apple products".

Track listing 

Notes
 "Device Control" and its reprise are not included in audio-only releases of the album, with "Mitsubishi Sony" extended to 2:51, leading to a total length of 38:17.
 There are some discrepancies between various track listings of the album. Not all releases list the songs "Ambience 001: A Certain Way", "Xenons", "Ambience 002: Honey Baby", "Walk Away", "Impietas", "Mitsubishi Sony", and the reprise of "Device Control" in their track lists.
"Comme des Garçons" is incorrectly spelt "Commes des Garcons" in video releases.
"Mitsubishi Sony" is stylized as "Mitsu-Sony" in the VHS/DVD releases.

Sample credits
 "At Your Best (You Are Love)" is a cover of the Isley Brothers song "(At Your Best) You Are Love". Ocean released this song on his Tumblr page as a tribute to Aaliyah (who also covered the song), on the day that would have been her 36th birthday.
 "Hublots" contains samples from "We Ride Tonight", performed by Sherbet and written by Garth Porter, Anthony Mitchell and Daryl Braithwaite
 "Ambience 001: A Certain Way" contains a sample from Crystal LaBeija's dialogue in The Queen, and "I Think I Am in Love With You", performed by Wee and written by Norman Whiteside.
 "Ambience 002: Honey Baby" contains samples from "Vapor Barato", performed by Gal Costa and written by Jards Macalé and Waly Salomão.

Personnel

Film 

 Frank Ocean – direction
 Francis Soriano – direction of photography, editing
 Thomas Mastorakos – producer design
 Wendi Morris – production
 Rita Zebdi – wardrobe
 Henri Helander – wardrobe assistance
 Paper Mache Monkey – art department
 TMG – set construction
 Grant Lau – VFX
 Brandon Chavez – coloring
 Caleb Laven – sound mixing
 Keith Ferreira – 1st AC
 Taj Francois – assistant editing/DIT
 Maarten Hofmeijer – sound design
 Brent Kiser – sound design

Album 

Vocalists
 Frank Ocean – lead vocals
 Wolfgang Tillmans – performance ("Device Control")
 Jazmine Sullivan – vocals ("Hublots"), additional vocals ("Alabama"), background vocals ("Wither" and "Rushes")
 Sampha – additional vocals ("Alabama")
 Rita Zebdi – additional vocals ("Comme des Garçons")
Other musicians
 James Blake – synthesizers ("At Your Best (You Are Love)")
 Christophe Chassol – piano ("U-N-I-T-Y")
 Kyle Combs – synthesizers ("Device Control")
 Alex G – guitars ("U-N-I-T-Y", "Wither" "Slide On Me", "Rushes" and "Higgs")
 Jonny Greenwood – string orchestration ("At Your Best (You Are Love)")
 Austin Hollows; guitars ("Higgs")
 Om'Mas Keith – piano ("At Your Best (You Are Love)")
 Tim Knapp – synthesizers, drum programming ("Device Control")
 London Contemporary Orchestra – orchestra credits ("At Your Best (You Are Love)")
 Troy Noka – programming ("Deathwish (ASR)" and "Rushes To"), drum programming ("Comme des Garçons" and "In Here Somewhere"), synthesizers ("In Here Somewhere")
 Nolife – drum programming ("Sideways")
 Frank Ocean – piano ("Alabama", "Wither" and "Hublots"), additional programming ("In Here Somewhere" and "Deathwish (ASR)"), guitars ("Rushes To")
 Ben Reed – bass ("Comme des Garçons", "Wither", "Slide on Me" and "Rushes")
 Buddy Ross – synthesizers ("Mine", "U-N-I-T-Y", "Comme des Garçons", "Slide on Me", "Sideways" and "Rushes"), bass ("Florida")
 SebastiAn – programming, synthesizers ("Rushes To", "At Your Best (You Are Love)" and "Higgs"), additional programming, synthesizers ("Slide on Me")
 Nico Segal – trumpet ("U-N-I-T-Y")
 Rosie Slater – additional drums ("Device Control")
 Spaceman – guitars ("In Here Somewhere", "Deathwish (ASR)", "Rushes" and "Rushes To")
 Michael Uzowuru – programming ("Rushes To")
 Vegyn – programming ("Xenons", "Deathwish (ASR)", "Rushes To" and "Mitsubishi Sony"), drum programming ("Comme des Garçons", "In Here Somewhere", "Slide on Me" and "Sideways"), bass ("Slide on Me")
 88-Keys – additional programming ("Hublots")

Production
 Frank Ocean – executive production, production
 Vegyn – production
 Troy Noka – production
 Michael Uzowuru – production
 Arca – production ("Mine")
 88-Keys – production ("Hublots")
 Stwo – co-production ("U-N-I-T-Y")
 Frank Dukes – co-production ("U-N-I-T-Y")

Technical
 Caleb Laven – recording engineering
 Beatríz Artola – additional recording engineering
 Greg Koller – additional recording engineering
 Eric Caudieux – additional recording engineering
 Graeme Stewart – orchestra engineering 
 Tom Elmhirst – mix engineering
 Noah Goldstein – mix engineering
 Joe Visciano – assistant mix engineering
 Mike Dean – mastering

Design
 Frank Ocean – creative direction
 Thomas Mastorakos – creative direction, photography
 Michel Egger – graphic design
 Kevin McCaughey – graphic design

Release history

Notes

References

2016 video albums
Frank Ocean albums
Def Jam Recordings video albums
ITunes-exclusive releases
Albums produced by Frank Dukes
Albums produced by 88-Keys
Albums produced by Vegyn
Visual albums
Surprise albums
Albums produced by Michael Uzowuru